Diyarbakır Archaeological Museum is an archaeological museum in Diyarbakır, Turkey.

References

Archaeological museums in Turkey
Buildings and structures in Diyarbakır